Ceriana is a genus of hoverfly. All species are wasp mimics.

Systematics
Species include:

C. abbreviata Loew, 1864
C. alboseta (Ferguson, 1926)
C. ancoralis (Coquillett, 1902)
C. annulifera (Walker , 1861)
C.antipoda (Bigot 1860)
C.apicalis (Ferguson 1926)
C.aurata (Curran 1927)
C.australis (Macquart 1850)
C.brevis (Brunetti , 1923)
C. brunettii (Shannon, 1927)
C. brunettii (Shannon 1927)
C. brunnea (Hull , 1944)
C. cacica (Walker , 1860)
C. caesarea (Stackelberg, 1928)
C. caucasica (Paramonov, 1927)
C. chekiangensis (Ôuchi, 1943)
C. chiefengensis (Ôuchi, 1943)
C. compacta (Brunetti , 1907)
C. conopsoides (Linnaeus, 1758)
C. cylindrica (Curran, 1921)
C. dilatipes (Brunetti , 1929)
C. dimidiatipennis (Brunetti , 1923)
C. dirickxi (Thompson, 2013)
C. divisa (Walker , 1857)
C. durani (Davidson, 1925)
C. euphara (Riek, 1954)
C. formosensis (Shiraki, 1930)
C. gibbosa Violovitsh, 1980
C. glaebosa (Steenis, Ricartean Steenis, Ricarte, Vujic, Birtele & Speight, 2016)
C. hungkingi (Shannon , 1927)
C. ismayi (Thompson, 2015)
C. lypra (Riek, 1954)
C. macquarti Shannon, 1925
C. mellivora (Shannon , 1927)
C. mime (Hull, 1935)
C. naja Violovitsh, 1974
C. oceanica (Hull , 1944)
C. optata (Riek, 1954)
C. opuntiae (Ferguson, 1926)
C. ornata (Saunders 1845)
C. opuntiae (Ferguson, 1926)
C. ornatifrons (Brunetti , 1915)
C. pedicellata (Williston, 1887)
C. pictula (Loew, 1853)
C. platypus (Ferguson, 1926)
C. ponti (Thompson, 2013)
C. relictura (Walker , 1858)
C. rieki (Goot, 1964)
C. sartorum Smirnov, 1924
C. saundersi (Shannon , 1925)
C. skevingtoni (Steenis, Ricartean Steenis, Ricarte, Vujic, Birtele & Speight, 2016)
C. smaragdina (Walker , 1858)
C. snowi (Adams, 1904)
C. sphenotoma (Riek, 1954)
C. tridens (Loew, 1872)
C. vespiformis (Latreille, 1804)
C. wyatti (Thompson, 2015)

References

Eristalinae
Hoverfly genera
Taxa named by Constantine Samuel Rafinesque